is a Japanese master of Shotokan karate. He is the founder of the Istituto Shotokan Italia, a subdivision of FIKTA (the Italian Traditional Karate Association) and of the SCI (Shotokan Cultural Institute, formerly WSI - World Shotokan Institute). Shirai holds the title of Shihan and is responsible for taking the dan examinations within SCI and, together with Carlo Fugazza, for those within the FIKTA.

Biography
Shirai was born on 31 July 1937 in Nagasaki, Japan. He started learning karate in 1956, three years after seeing a promotional video of the Japan Karate Association (JKA) at Komazawa University.

In 1962, he won both the kata and the kumite championships of the JKA, thereby becoming one of those receiving the title 'Grand Champion'.

After a world trip to promote karate together with Taiji Kase, Hirokazu Kanazawa, and Keinosuke Enoeda to Europe, South Africa, and the United States of America, he settled in Milan, Italy in 1965. Under his tutelage the Italian karate flourished and many titles went to his students.

Goshindo

Shirai feels that the self-defence (goshindo) aspect of Shotokan karate has been too much in the shadow of kumite and kata. Although he practised karate for self-defence initially, he focussed on kumite for a few years until moving to Europe. He started refocussing on self-defence and its incorporation in the practise of shotokan karate.

During the last years Shirai has given special goshindo oriented stages in Europe often together with Claudio Ceruti, Massimo Abate, and Angelo Torre.

Graduation history
Shirai received the following dan ranks: 1st - 1957; 2nd - 1959; 3rd - 1961; 4th - unknown year; 5th - 1964; 6th - 1969; 7th - 1974; 8th - 1986, 9th - 1999. His current rank, 10th dan, he received in 2011.

See also
 List of Shotokan organizations
 World Karate Federation

References

External links 
 FIKTA webpage on Hiroshi Shirai
 Contributo al Maestro - di Davide Rizzo
 German Traditional Karate Association page on Hiroshi Shirai
 World Shotokan Institute - Poland

1937 births
Japanese male karateka
Karate coaches
Martial arts school founders
Sportspeople from Milan
People from Nagasaki
Shotokan practitioners
Living people